DuBois Area Senior High School is a midsized, rural, public high school located in the city of DuBois, Pennsylvania. The high school serves students from most of north-western Clearfield County, and in Jefferson County, it covers the Boroughs of Falls Creek, Reynoldsville, Sykesville, and Winslow Township.  The school is part of the DuBois Area School District. In the 2018–2019 school year, DuBois Area Senior High School had 1,009 students enrolled in grades 9–12.

Extracurriculars
DuBois Area School District offers a wide variety of clubs, activities and a sports program.

Sports
The District funds:

Boys
Baseball - AAAA
Basketball- AAAA
Cross Country - AAA
Football - AAAA
Golf - AAA
Rifle - AAAA
Soccer - AAA
Swimming and Diving - AAA
Tennis - AAA
Track and Field - AAA
Volleyball - AAA
Wrestling - AAA

Girls
Basketball - AAAA
Cheer - AAAA
Cross Country - AAA
Golf - AAA
Gymnastics - AAAA
Rifle - AAAA
Soccer (Fall) - AAA
Softball - AAAA
Swimming and Diving - AAA
Girls' Tennis - AAA
Track and Field - AAA
Volleyball - AAA

According to PIAA directory July 2012

References

Public high schools in Pennsylvania
Schools in Clearfield County, Pennsylvania